Zardeh, also known as Zarde and Razdeh, may refer to various places in Iran:
Zardeh, Dalahu, Kermanshah Province
Zardeh, Kangavar, Kermanshah Province
Zardeh-ye Seyyed Mohammad, Kermanshah Province
Zardeh, Zanjan
Zardeh Savar (disambiguation)